The top level of women's cricket in England has undergone a number of structural changes. These changes have resulted in a number of teams becoming defunct, often being replaced by multiple teams covering smaller areas.

The teams listed below competed in either the Women's Area Championship (1980–1996) or the Women's County Championship (1997–2019). Although many of the teams listed played matches before these competitions, only the seasons in which they participated in these competitions are included in the table.

Defunct teams

References

!
Women's cricket teams
Defunct English women's cricket teams
English women's cricket
Defunct women's sports teams